"Better Believe It" is a song by the American rapper Lil Boosie which was the lead single from his second studio album Superbad: The Return of Boosie Bad Azz. It was released on July 10, 2009. It features additional verses from Young Jeezy and label-mate Webbie. On YouTube, it has been watched over 10 million times.

Chart positions

References 

2009 songs
2009 singles
Lil Boosie songs
Jeezy songs
Webbie songs
Songs written by Webbie
Songs written by Jeezy